The 2016 Popular Democratic Party primaries was the primary elections by which voters of the Popular Democratic Party (PPD) chose its nominees for various political offices of Puerto Rico for the 2016 general elections. They were held on June 5, 2016 and also coincided with the Democratic Party primaries in the island.

Candidates

Governor

Incumbent Governor Alejandro García Padilla announced in December 2015 that he will not run for reelection. His former Secretary of State, David Bernier, announced soon after his candidacy for governor.

Resident Commissioner

 Héctor Ferrer, former House Representative and President of the Popular Democratic Party of Puerto Rico
 Ángel Rosa, incumbent Senator

Senate

At-large

 José Aponte Carro
 Wanda Arroyo
 Eduardo Bhatia
 Antonio Fas Alzamora
 Luisa Gándara

 Rossana López León
 José Nadal Power
 Miguel Pereira Castillo
 Cirilo Tirado Rivera
 Aníbal José Torres

House of Representatives

At-large

 Jorge Colberg Toro
 Ulises Dalmau
 Brenda López de Arrarás
 Cristofer Malespín
 Manuel Natal Albelo
 Jesús Manuel Ortíz
 Mario Pabón

 Jaime Perelló
 Gil A. Rodríguez
 Yaramary Torres
 Luis Vega Ramos
 Eluis Vick
 Roberto Vigoreaux

Results

Resident Commissioner

Senate

At-large

See also

New Progressive Party of Puerto Rico primaries, 2016

References

External links
Comisión Estatal de Elecciones
Comisionado Electoral PPD

Primary elections in Puerto Rico
PPD
Popular Democratic Party (Puerto Rico)